The Journal of Educational Psychology is a peer-reviewed academic journal that was established in 1910 and covers educational psychology. It is published by the American Psychological Association.

The current editor-in-chief is Steve Graham (Arizona State University). The journal publishes original psychological research on education at all ages and educational levels, as well as occasional theoretical and review articles deemed of particular importance.

According to the Journal Citation Reports, the journal has a 2020 impact factor of 5.805.

The journal has implemented the Transparency and Openness Promotion (TOP) Guidelines.  The TOP Guidelines provide structure to research planning and reporting and aim to make research more transparent, accessible, and reproducible.

References

External links 
 

English-language journals
American Psychological Association academic journals
Educational psychology journals
Quarterly journals
Publications established in 1910